Studeničani is a village in North Macedonia. It is a seat of Studeničani municipality.

Demographics
According to the 1467-68 Ottoman defter, Studeničani appears as being inhabited by an Orthodox Albanian population. Some families had a mixed Slav-Albanian anthroponomy - usually a Slavic first name and an Albanian last name or last names with Albanian patronyms and Slavic suffixes. 

The names are:Gjon son of Gjur-ko, Dono son of Dimitri, Pejo son of Dimitri, Boja Dimitri, Stanisha son of Gur-ko, Gur-ko his son (Stanisha), Dimitri son of Span.  

According to the 2021 census, the village had a total of 8.004 inhabitants. Ethnic groups in the village include:

Albanians 7.446
Macedonians 316
Turks 4
Serbs 2 
Vlachs 1
Bosniaks 1
Others 233

References

Villages in Studeničani Municipality
Albanian communities in North Macedonia